Quinton is a village in the Canadian province of Saskatchewan within the Rural Municipality of Mount Hope No. 279 and Census Division No. 10. The village is located on Highway 15 between the Town of Raymore and the Village of Punnichy. It is near the administrative office of the Kawacatoose First Nations.

History 
Quinton incorporated as a village on March 1, 1910.

Climate

Demographics 

See also

 List of communities in Saskatchewan
 Hamlets of Saskatchewan

References

Villages in Saskatchewan
Mount Hope No. 279, Saskatchewan
Division No. 10, Saskatchewan